Vare is the surname of:

 Ethlie Ann Vare, (born 1953), Canadian-American journalist and screenwriter
 Flora M. Vare (1874-1962), American politician
 Glenna Collett-Vare (1903–1989), American golfer
 Jack Vare (born 1986), Papua New Guinean cricketer
 Marjaana Vare (born 1967), Finnish Paralympian athlete 
 Raivo Vare (born 1958), Estonian politician, entrepreneur, and transit and economic expert.
 William Scott Vare (1867–1934), American politician

See also
 Onnu Muthal Poojyam Vare, Malayalam language drama film (1986) 
 Mazhavillinattam Vare, upcoming Malayalam–language sports and musical film 
 Väre (disambiguation)